Ricardo Villar (born August 11, 1979) is a Brazilian former professional footballer who played as a midfielder.

Career
Born in São Paulo, Villar began his football career in the youth ranks of famed Brazilian side São Paulo FC. In 1996, he left Brazil to attend Penn State University in the United States where he played College Soccer for four years. Upon ending his college career Villar remained in the United States and played for lower level sides Hampton Roads Mariners and Pittsburgh Riverhounds.

In 2004, he would leave the United States and join Austrian top flight side SV Austria Salzburg where he would remain for one year and be relatively used. After a brief stay in South Korea with Chunnam Dragons, Villar joined Germany's 1. FC Kaiserslautern and remained there for one season. In 2007, he joined SpVgg Unterhaching and was a key player for the club appearing in 63 league matches and scoring 9 goals. After three years in Germany Villar joined Greek side AS Rodos and remained at the club for one season making 15 appearances and scoring 1 goal. In the off-season he returned to SpVgg Unterhaching in time for the 2010–11 season.

On February 7, 2011, Villar signed with Major League Soccer club FC Dallas.

Personal life
He also holds Italian citizenship.

References

External links
 Profile at epae.org
 
 
 

1979 births
Living people
Brazilian footballers
Penn State Nittany Lions men's soccer players
Association football midfielders
Pittsburgh Riverhounds SC players
FC Red Bull Salzburg players
Jeonnam Dragons players
1. FC Kaiserslautern players
SpVgg Unterhaching players
FC Dallas players
Rodos F.C. players
Major League Soccer players
Austrian Football Bundesliga players
2. Bundesliga players
K League 1 players
Virginia Beach Mariners players
A-League (1995–2004) players
USL Second Division players
FC Dallas draft picks
3. Liga players
All-American men's college soccer players
Brazilian expatriate footballers
Brazilian expatriate sportspeople in Austria
Expatriate footballers in Austria
Brazilian expatriate sportspeople in the United States
Expatriate soccer players in the United States
Brazilian expatriate sportspeople in South Korea
Expatriate footballers in South Korea
Brazilian expatriate sportspeople in Germany
Expatriate footballers in Germany
Brazilian expatriate sportspeople in Greece
Expatriate footballers in Greece
Footballers from São Paulo